Barry Seebaran (born September 12, 1972) is a Canadian cricketer. He was a left-arm orthodox bowler, with the ability to bowl an effective arm ball.

Born in Vancouver, British Columbia, the son of a former player, Seebaran first played for the National team in 1989 and was selected a year later for the 1990 ICC Trophy in the Netherlands, justifying his position at such an early age by being the best spin bowler in the tournament. He represented Canada from 1989 to 2003 including Canada vs USA Test Matches, 4 ICC World Cups, Shell Sandals Tournaments in Jamaica and St Lucia, the 1998 Commonwealth Games in Malaysia and his last appearance was One Day International cricket for Canada at the 2003 World Cup. His most notable bowling spell was 3 for 23 vs India, including the wickets of Sachin Tendulkar and Rahul Dravid. Barry Seebaran is a follower of Jesus Christ and currently resides in Queensland, Australia, teaching English and PE at Dalby Christian College before leaving in 2022. He now teaches English and Hockey at Livingstone Christian College.

References

1972 births
Canada One Day International cricketers
Canadian cricketers
Canadian sportspeople of Indian descent
Cricketers at the 1998 Commonwealth Games
Cricketers from British Columbia
Living people
Sportspeople from Vancouver
Canadian cricket coaches
Commonwealth Games competitors for Canada